Nigeria Olympic football team represents Nigeria in international football competitions in Olympic Games. The selection is limited to male players under the age of 23, except during the Olympic Games where the use of three overage players is allowed. The team is controlled by the Nigeria Football Federation. In four appearances at the Olympic games, the team  won gold in 1996, silver in 2008 and bronze in 2016.

Competitive record

Olympic Games record

 Prior to the Barcelona 1992 campaign, the Football at the Summer Olympics was open to full senior national teams.

African Games record

 Prior to the 1991 All-Africa Games campaign, the football tournament was open to full senior national teams.
  2019 edition of the football tournament was played by the U-20 team.

U-23 Africa Cup of Nations record

Team honours and achievements
Intercontinental
Football at the Summer Olympics
Gold Medal: 1996
Silver Medal: 2008
Bronze Medal: 2016

Continental
 U-23 Africa Cup of Nations
Winners: 2015
Football at the African Games
Silver Medal: 2003
Bronze Medal: 1991, 1995, 2015,

Other
Inter Continental Cup
Winners: 2008
Niger Tournament
Winners: 2002
TIFOCO Tournament
Third-place: 2003

Players

Current squad
Squad for the 2023 Africa U-23 Cup of Nations qualifiers vs. Guinea

Overage players in Olympic Games

Recent results

2019

See also

References

External links
Official Nigeria Football Federation website

under23
African national under-23 association football teams